Kargo is a rock band from Istanbul, Turkey. Its current line-up includes Selim Öztürk on electric guitar, Burak Karataş on drums and Ozan Anlaş on vocals.

History

The band was formed in the early years of the 1990s by Selim Öztürk (guitar) and Mehmet Şenol Şişli (bass guitar).  Although the Turkish music industry was dominated by pop music, Kargo was able to break through with their first album Sil Baştan (Start Over). The first line-up soon broke up and the two founders had to find new members.

The first recruit to join Kargo was Serkan Çeliköz, who is the brother of one of Mehmet's university schoolmates. Being a music student and able to play a wide range of instruments such as keyboard, guitar, violin, bassoon and contrabass made Serkan a suitable candidate. Later Burak Karataş joined Kargo as the drummer and the only spot left to fill was that of lead singer. Koray Candemir, who impressed the other members by his performance in a local bar, was offered the position. With his acceptance Kargo began to record their album Yarına Ne Kaldı (What is left for tomorrow?) which became a hit in 1996. Yüzleşme, the first single from the album Yarına Ne Kaldı, rose to the top of the charts even though it was a pure rock song, proving that a rock group can be successful in the Turkish music industry.

In 1997, Kargo released their second album Sevmek Zor (Love is Hard). Sevmek Zor was dedicated to different kind of emotions that can occur in a romantic relationship. Every song had a theme such as pureness, cheating, sadness, guilt, distance, hope, acceptance, and pain.

Problems that occurred because of unsuccessful tour organization made Kargo bitter. They decided to express their anger in their next album Yalnızlık Mevsimi (Season of Loneliness). In Yalnızlık Mevsimi all songs were written and arranged in an order to tell a one coherent story about being alone. It proved popular among fans of the band.

In 2000, Kargo released Sen Bir Meleksin (You are an angel) as their fifth album. Sen Bir Meleksin was soft and acoustic when compared to the previous album Yalnızlık Mevsimi. With this album Kargo was able to reach many new listeners from older age groups.

After Sen Bir Meleksin, Kargo decided to take a break to pursue their personal projects. They released the Best of Kargo compilation before this hiatus. Kargo's lead singer Koray Candemir released his first solo album Sade while Selim and Serkan Celikoz successfully produced albums for many different artists.

In 2003, Kargo decided that it was time to release a new album together. However, bass player MŞŞ (Mehmet Şenol Şişli) declined to participate. The rest of the band started working on their seventh album early in 2004 and Ateş ve Su (Fire and Water) was released in May of that year.

In 2005, they released Yıldızların Altında (Under the Stars) containing cover songs, as well as remixes of older Kargo songs. The first single, which the album was named after, became a hit both on radio and television. With the success of Yıldızların Altında Kargo toured Turkey, performing more than 100 concerts in a year which became the second highest number of concerts played by a Turkish rock artist .

In December 2008, Koray Candemir and Serkan Çeliköz announced that they had quit Kargo after 14 years. Only a few weeks after the announcement, Mehmet Şenol Şişli ended his hiatus and rejoined the band as Kargo's main bass player.

Band members

Current members 
 Haluk Babadoğan – Vocals (2014–present)
 Selim Öztürk – Guitar (1993–present)
 Burak Karataş – Drums (1996–present)
 Mehmet Şenol Şişli – Bass guitar (1993–2001, 2008–2010, 2015–)

Former members 
 Deniz Aytekin – Vocals (1993–1994)
 Aykan İlkan – Drums (1993–1994)
 Atilla Yüksel – Keyboard (1993–1994)
 Koray Candemir – Vocals (1994–2008)
 Serkan Çeliköz – Keyboard (1994–2008)
 Reha Hendem – Vocals (2008–2010)
 Ozan Anlaş – Vocals (2011–2014)

Discography

Studio albums
Sil Baştan (Start Over) (1993)
Yarına Ne Kaldı (What Is Left For Tomorrow) (1996)
Sevmek Zor (Loving is Hard) (1997)
Yalnızlık Mevsimi (Season of Loneliness) (1998)
Sen Bir Meleksin (You are an Angel) (2000)
Ateş ve Su (Fire and Water) (2004)
Gelecekle Randevum Var (2013)
Değiştir Dünyayı (2016)

Other albums
Best of Kargo (2001) - Compilation album
Yıldızların Altında (Under the Stars) (2005) - Cover album
RRDP (2010) - Mirkelam & Kargo split album

Singles
Herkesin Geçtiği Yoldan Geçme (Don't Take Roads Taken by Everyone) (2000)
Efes Dark CD (2000)
Kehribar (2012)
Mazi Kalbimde Bir Yaradır (2014) - (with Dilek Türkan)

References

External links 
Official website

Turkish rock music groups
Musical groups from Istanbul
Musical groups established in 1993
1993 establishments in Turkey